Bathybagrus sianenna is a species of claroteid catfish endemic to Lake Tanganyika on the border of Burundi, the Democratic Republic of the Congo, Tanzania, and Zambia. Its natural habitats are rivers and freshwater lakes.  It grows to a length of 23.0 cm (9.1 inches) SL and is a component of local subsistence fisheries.

References
 

Claroteidae
Fish of Africa
Fish described in 1906